The 2007 Women's Australian Hockey League was the 15th edition of the women's field hockey tournament. The tournament was held between 23 February – 8 April 2007 at various venues, before culminating in Brisbane for the finals.

WA Diamonds won the tournament for the fourth time after defeating QLD Scorchers 2–1 in the final. VIC Vipers finished in third place after defeating NSW Arrows 2–1 in the third and fourth place playoff.

Participating teams

 Canberra Strikers
 NSW Arrows
 Territory Pearls
 QLD Scorchers
 Adelaide Suns
 Tassie Van Demons
 VIC Vipers
 WA Diamonds

Competition format
The 2007 Women's Australian Hockey League consisted of a single round robin format, followed by classification matches. 

Teams from all 8 states and territories competed against one another throughout the pool stage. At the conclusion of the pool stage, the top four ranked teams progressed to the semi-finals, while the bottom four teams continued to the classification stage.

Point allocation
Match points were allocated as follows:

· 3 points for a win
· 1 point to each team in the event of a draw
· 0 points to the loser of the match

Results

Preliminary round

Fixtures

Classification round

Fifth to eighth place classification

Crossover

Seventh and eighth place

Fifth and sixth place

First to fourth place classification

Semi-finals

Third and fourth place

Final

Awards

Statistics

Final standings

Goalscorers

References

External links

2007
2007 in Australian women's field hockey